The Black Corsair   is an  adventure film. It is based on two Emilio Salgari novels, The Black Corsair and The Queen of the Caribbean.

Plot 
Emilio di Roccabruna, The Black Corsair, seeks revenge against Governor Van Gould for the murder of his family.

Cast 
Kabir Bedi: The Black Corsair
Carole André: Dutchess Honorata Van Gould
Mel Ferrer: Van Gould
Angelo Infanti: Morgan
Jackie Basehart: The Red Corsair
 Niccolò Piccolomini: The Green Corsair
Sal Borgese: Carmaux
Franco Fantasia: Van Stiller
Tony Renis: José
Sonja Jeannine: Yara
Edoardo Faieta: L'Olonnais
Mariano Rigillo: Count of Lerma
Dagmar Lassander: Marquise of Bermejo

Release
The Black Corsair was released on December 22, 1976.

See also 
List of Italian films of 1976

References

Footnotes

Sources

External links

1976 films
Films shot in Colombia
Films based on The Corsairs of the Antilles
Films set in the 1660s
Films scored by Guido & Maurizio De Angelis
Films based on multiple works of a series
Pirate films
Italian swashbuckler films
Cultural depictions of Henry Morgan
1970s Italian films